Henry Bowman may refer to:

Henry Bowman (composer) ( 1677), English composer
Henry Bowman (architect) (1814–1883), English architect
Henry Robson Bowman (1896–1954), politician in British Columbia, Canada
Henry Bowman, protagonist of Unintended Consequences